The 1995 NCAA Division II football season, part of college football in the United States organized by the National Collegiate Athletic Association at the Division II level, began on September 2, 1995, and concluded with the NCAA Division II Football Championship on December 9, 1995, at Braly Municipal Stadium in Florence, Alabama, hosted by the University of North Alabama. The North Alabama Lions defeated the Pittsburg State Gorillas, 27–7, to win their third consecutive, and overall, Division II national title.

The Harlon Hill Trophy was awarded to Ronald McKinnon, linebacker from North Alabama.

Conference changes and new programs
 The NAIA Arkansas Intercollegiate Conference disbanded before the start of the season, with its football members departing for  the Gulf South and Lone Star conferences.
 Two teams departed Division II for Division I-AA prior to the season.

Conference standings

Conference summaries

Postseason

The 1995 NCAA Division II Football Championship playoffs were the 22nd single-elimination tournament to determine the national champion of men's NCAA Division II college football. The championship game was held at Braly Municipal Stadium in Florence, Alabama, for the ninth time.

Playoff bracket

See also
1995 NCAA Division I-A football season
1995 NCAA Division I-AA football season
1995 NCAA Division III football season
1995 NAIA Division I football season
1995 NAIA Division II football season

References